The following teams and players took part in the men's volleyball tournament at the 1968 Summer Olympics, in Mexico City.

Belgium
The following volleyball players represented Belgium:
 Benno Saelens
 Bernard Vaillant
 Berto Poosen
 Fernand Walder
 Hugo Huybrechts
 Jozef Mol
 Leo Dierckx
 Paul Mestdagh
 Roger Maes
 Roger Vandergoten
 Ronald Vandewal
 Willem Bossaerts

Brazil
The following volleyball players represented Brazil:
 Antônio Carlos Moreno
 Feitosa
 Décio de Azevedo
 Gerson Schuch
 João Jens
 Jorge de Souza
 José da Costa
 Marco Antônio Volpi
 Mário Dunlop
 Paulo Peterle
 Sérgio Pinheiro
 Victor Borges

Bulgaria
The following volleyball players represented Bulgaria:
 Aleksandar Aleksandrov
 Aleksandar Trenev
 Angel Koritarov
 Dimitar Karov
 Dimitar Zlatanov
 Dinko Atanasov
 Gramen Prinov
 Kiril Slavov
 Milcho Milev
 Petar Krachmarov
 Stoyan Stoyanov
 Zdravko Simeonov

Czechoslovakia
The following volleyball players represented Czechoslovakia:
 Bohumil Golian
 Antonín Procházka
 Petr Kop
 Jiří Svoboda
 Josef Musil
 Lubomír Zajíček
 Josef Smolka
 Vladimír Petlák
 František Sokol
 Zdeněk Groessl
 Pavel Schenk
 Drahomír Koudelka

East Germany
The following volleyball players represented East Germany:
 Arnold Schulz
 Eckehard Pietzsch
 Eckhard Tielscher
 Horst Peter
 Jürgen Freiwald
 Jürgen Kessel
 Manfred Heine
 Rainer Tscharke
 Rudi Schumann
 Siegfried Schneider
 Walter Toussaint
 Wolfgang Webner

Japan
The following volleyball players represented Japan:
 Masayuki Minami
 Katsutoshi Nekoda
 Mamoru Shiragami
 Isao Koizumi
 Kenji Kimura
 Yasuaki Mitsumori
 Jungo Morita
 Tadayoshi Yokota
 Seiji Oko
 Tetsuo Sato
 Kenji Shimaoka

Mexico
The following volleyball players represented Mexico:
 Antonio Barbet
 Carlos Aguirre
 Carlos Barron
 César Osuna
 Eduardo Jiménez
 Eduardo Sixtos
 Francisco González
 Jesús Loya
 Joël Calva
 Juan Manuel Durán
 Leopoldo Reyna
 Luis Martell

Poland
The following volleyball players represented Poland:
 Aleksander Skiba
 Edward Skorek
 Hubert Wagner
 Jerzy Szymczyk
 Romuald Paszkiewicz
 Stanisław Gościniak
 Stanisław Zduńczyk
 Tadeusz Siwek
 Wojciech Rutkowski
 Zbigniew Jasiukiewicz
 Zbigniew Zarzycki
 Zdzisław Ambroziak

Soviet Union
The following volleyball players represented the Soviet Union:
 Eduard Sibiryakov
 Yuriy Poiarkov
 Georgy Mondzolevsky
 Valery Kravchenko
 Volodymyr Bieliaiev
 Yevhen Lapynskiy
 Ivans Bugajenkovs
 Oļegs Antropovs
 Vasilijus Matuševas
 Viktor Mykhalchuk
 Borys Tereshchuk
 Volodymyr Ivanov

United States
The following volleyball players represented the United States:
 John Alstrom
 Mike Bright
 Wink Davenport
 Smitty Duke
 Tom Haine
 John Henn
 Butch May
 Danny Patterson
 Larry Rundle
 Jon Stanley
 Rudy Suwara
 Pete Velasco

References

1968